Kakhovsky (masculine), Kakhovskaya (feminine), or Kakhovskoye (neuter) may refer to:
Kakhovskaya Line, a line of the Moscow Metro, Moscow, Russia
Kakhovskaya (Metro), a station of the Moscow Metro

Family name 
Mikhail Kakhovsky (1734–1800), Russian infantry general
Pyotr Kakhovsky (1797–1826), Russian Decembrist

See also
Kakhovka, a city in Kherson Oblast, Ukraine (adjectival form "Kakhovsky")

Russian-language surnames